Əliyaqublu is a village and municipality in the Shamkir Rayon of Azerbaijan. It has a population of 2,208. The village mosque was constructed in 1998.

References

Populated places in Shamkir District